Jerry Wayne Terrell (born July 13, 1946) is an American former professional baseball player. The former infielder from Elysian, Minnesota, attended Minnesota State University, Mankato and played in the Major Leagues for the Minnesota Twins (1973–1977) and Kansas City Royals (1978–1980), appearing in 657 games played and collecting 412 hits.

Terrell was chosen by his home-state Twins in the 18th round of the 1968 Major League Baseball draft, and began his minor league career in 1968, missing the 1969 season while serving in the U.S. military during the Vietnam War. In his final campaign, for the  American League champion Royals, he played in only 23 games and did not appear in the 1980 World Series. In 1980, he was the only MLB player out of 970 to vote against going on strike.

On August 20, 1979, Terrell made his pitching debut for the Royals in the ninth inning against the New York Yankees at Royals Stadium, and retired the Yankees on three pitches; the Yankees were ahead 16–4 at the time and Terrell hurled on an emergency basis.

After his playing days, Terrell was a longtime scout, working for both the Royals and Twins, as well as the Montreal Expos.

References

External links
, or Retrosheet, or SABR Biography Project

1946 births
Living people
American expatriate baseball players in Venezuela
Auburn Twins players
Baseball players from Minnesota
Cangrejeros de Santurce (baseball) players
Charlotte Hornets (baseball) players
Florida Instructional League Twins players
Kansas City Royals players
Kansas City Royals scouts
Liga de Béisbol Profesional Roberto Clemente infielders
Lynchburg Twins players
Major League Baseball infielders
Military personnel from Minnesota
Minnesota State Mavericks baseball players
Minnesota Twins players
Minnesota Twins scouts
Minor league baseball managers
Montreal Expos scouts
Omaha Royals players
People from Waseca, Minnesota
Tacoma Twins players
Tiburones de La Guaira players

Minnesota State University, Mankato alumni